Teslin Water Aerodrome  was located  west of Teslin, Yukon, Canada. The airport was listed as abandoned in the 15 March 2007 Canada Flight Supplement.

References

Defunct seaplane bases in Yukon